Joan Linda La Barbara (born June 8, 1947) is an American vocalist and composer known for her explorations of non-conventional or "extended" vocal techniques. Considered to be a vocal virtuoso in the field of contemporary music, she is credited with advancing a new vocabulary of vocal sounds including trills, whispers, cries, sighs, inhaled tones, and multiphonics (singing two or more pitches simultaneously).

Biography
An influential figure in experimental music, La Barbara was born in Philadelphia, Pennsylvania. She is a classically trained singer who studied with soprano Helen Boatwright at Syracuse University and contralto Marion Freschl at the Juilliard School in New York.

Joan La Barbara's early creative work (early to mid 1970s) focuses on experimentation and investigation of vocal sound as raw sonic material including works that explore varied timbres on a single pitch, circular breathing techniques inspired by horn players, and multiphonic or chordal singing. In the mid 1970s, she began creating more structured compositional works, some of which include electronics and layered voice sounds.

She has accumulated a large repertoire of vocal works by 20th- and 21st-century music masters, including many pieces composed especially for her voice.    She has performed and recorded works by composers including John Cage, Robert Ashley, Morton Feldman, Philip Glass, Larry Austin, Peter Gordon, Alvin Lucier, and her husband Morton Subotnick, and has collaborated with choreographer Merce Cunningham, and poet Kenneth Goldsmith. She also received a Foundation for Contemporary Arts John Cage Award (2016).

La Barbara is a guest instructor at HB Studio.

Other Work
Joan La Barbara has also done work acting and composing for television, film, and dance. She composed and performed the music for the Sesame Street animated segment Signing Alphabet, for electronics and voice, and has composed a variety of chamber, orchestral, and choral works. She also appears in Matthew Barney’s 2014 film River of Fundament. La Barbara is currently on the music composition artist faculty at New York University Steinhardt School of Culture, Education, and Human Development, Department of Music and Performing Arts Professions, and on the faculty of Mannes/The New School/College of Performing Arts.

Discography

La Barbara works
 Voice Is the Original Instrument (2016). Arc Light Editions, vinyl release, ALE005.
 io: atmos (2009) New World Records, CD 80665
 Voice Is the Original Instrument: Early Works (2003). Lovely Music, CD 3003.
 Awakenings, for chamber ensemble (1994) Music & Arts, CD 830
 Shamansong (1998) New World Records, CD 8054
 73 Poems (1994) book and CD with Kenneth Goldsmith, Lovely Music, Ltd., CD 3002
 "Computer Music Series, Vol.13, The Virtuoso in the Computer Age III", l'albero dalle foglie azzurre (tree of blue leaves), for solo oboe and computer music on tape (1993) Centaur Records, CRC 2166
 Sound Paintings (1991) Lovely Music, Ltd., CD 3001
 Silent Scroll on Newband Plays Microtonal Works, (1990) Mode Records, #18
 The Art of Joan La Barbara (1985) Nonesuch, LP 78029-1
 As Lightning Comes, In Flashes (1983) Wizard Records, LP RVW 2283
 The Reluctant Gypsy (1980) Wizard Records, RVW 2279
 Tapesongs (1978) Chiaroscuro, LP CR-196
 Voice Is the Original Instrument: Early Works (1976) Wizard Records, LP 2266

Featured on works by other composers
 Johann Johannsson Arrival (Original Soundtrack) (2016) Deutsche Grammophon, CD  
 Robert Ashley Now Eleanor's Idea (2007) Lovely Music, Ltd., CD  1009 
 Robert Ashley Celestial Excursions (2004) Lovely Music, Ltd., CD 1007
 Robert Ashley Dust  (2000) Lovely Music, Ltd., CD 1006
 Robert Ashley Your Money My Life Goodbye  (1999) Lovely Music, Ltd., 1005
 John Cage John Cage at Summerstage with Joan La Barbara, William Winant and Leonard Stein  (1995), Music & Arts, CD 875
 Larry Austin La Barbara on  CDCM Computer Music Series, Vol. 13, The Virtuoso in the Computer Age III  (1993) Centaur Records, CRC 2166
 Morton Subotnick All my hummingbirds have alibis  (1993) The Voyager Company, CD-Rom LS36
 Charles Dodge The Waves  on "Any Resemblance is Purely Coincidental (1992) New Albion, NA 045
 Robert Ashley Improvement  (1992) Elektra/Nonesuch, double CD 79289-2 
 Steve Reich Voices and Organ  (1991) Deutsche Grammaphon, CD box 
 John Cage Joan La Barbara Singing Through John Cage (1990) New Albion, NA035
 Philip Glass Music in 12 Parts  (1990) Virgin Records
 Morton Feldman Three Voices for Joan La Barbara  (1989) New Albion, NA018
 Morton Subotnick Jacob's Room  (1987) Wergo, WER2014-50
 Morton Subotnick The Last Dream of the Beast on "The Art of Joan La Barbara", Nonesuch 78029–1, 1985, LP only
 John Cage Solo for voice 45  (1978) Chiaroscuro, LP CR-196, 1978
 Lou Harrison May Rain on "Prepared Piano--the First of Four Decades" with Richard Bunger, piano, Musical Heritage Society, LP MHS-4187
 Bruce Ditmas Aeray Dust  (1978) Chiaroscuro, CR-195
 Bruce Ditmas  Yellow  (1977) Wizard Records, LP #222, 1977, LP 
 Philip Glass North Star  (1977) Virgin Records, PZ-34669
 Philip Glass Music in 12 Parts (Parts 1 & 2) (1974) Virgin Records, LP 
 Steve Reich Voices and Organ  (1974) Deutsche Grammaphon, LP box 
 Garrett List Your Own Self (1973) Opus One Records, LP 
 Jim Hall Commitment (A&M/Horizon, 1976) on "Lament for a Fallen Matador (Based on "Adagio in G minor)", arr. by Don Sebesky
 Stanley Silverman and Richard Foreman Dr. Selavy's Magic Theatre (1973) Rainbow Collection records, LP
 The Living Theatre with Wavy Gravy (Hugh Romney) and The New Wilderness Preservation Band (1973)
 Don Sebesky The Rape of El Morro (1973) CTI Records LP

See also
 David Tudor

Further reading
 Zimmerman, Walter, Desert Plants – Conversations with 23 American Musicians, Berlin: Beginner Press in cooperation with Mode Records, 2020 (originally published in 1976 by A.R.C., Vancouver). The 2020 edition includes a cd featuring the original interview recordings with Larry Austin, Robert Ashley, Jim Burton, John Cage, Philip Corner, Morton Feldman, Philip Glass, Joan La Barbara, Garrett List, Alvin Lucier, John McGuire, Charles Morrow, J.B. Floyd (on Conlon Nancarrow), Pauline Oliveros, Charlemagne Palestine, Ben Johnston (on Harry Partch), Steve Reich, David Rosenboom, Frederic Rzewski, Richard Teitelbaum, James Tenney, Christian Wolff, and La Monte Young.

External links
 Joan La Barbara's website
 La Barbara's faculty page at NYU Steinhardt
 UbuWeb: La Barbara featuring 73 Poems (1993), text by Kenneth Goldsmith
 NewMusicBox cover: La Barbara in conversation with Molly Sheridan, January 30, 2006 (includes video) (plus a master class with La Barbara)
 La Barbara interview
 Interview with La Barbara by Bruce Duffie, August 16, 1991
 Excerpted La Barbara interview with Libby Van Cleve from the Oral History of American Music, February 17, 1998

Sources

American classical composers
Contemporary classical music performers
Electroacoustic music composers
1947 births
Living people
Avant-garde singers
American women classical composers
American women in electronic music
Musicians from Philadelphia
Singers from Pennsylvania
21st-century American composers
20th-century classical composers
21st-century classical composers
20th-century classical musicians
21st-century classical musicians
20th-century American women singers
21st-century American women singers
20th-century American composers
Classical musicians from Pennsylvania
20th-century women composers
21st-century women composers
20th-century American singers
21st-century American singers